A korsi or korsí, or sandali (Persian: کرسی) is a type of low table found in Iran and Afghanistan, with a heater underneath it, and blankets thrown over it. It is a traditional item of furniture in Iranian culture.
A family or other gathering sits on the floor around the korsi during the winter. A korsi used to be quite popular for entire families to gather together during yearly Yaldā celebrations.

Korsis are generally heated with electric elements or, traditionally, with a brazier containing hot coals that is placed under the table، some times coal brazier is placed in a hole digged previously before placing kursi ، this hole will be covered with wood timbers in warm seasons . The table is covered with a thick cloth called lahaf korsi (persian: لحاف کرسی) overhanging on all sides to keep its occupants warm. The occupants sit on large cushions around the korsi with the cloth over their laps.

A special woven rug called ru korsi (Persian: روکرسی), is usually placed over any blankets to protect them from food stains. Jajim textiles are sometimes used as the blankets for a korsi.

See also
 Kotatsu, a similar Japanese item
 Foot stove, a similar Dutch item

References

 

Tables (furniture)
Iranian culture
Heaters